Andrés Felipe Amaya Rivera (born 24 April 2001) is a Colombian footballer who currently plays as a midfielder for Atlético Huila. He was included in The Guardian's "Next Generation 2018".

Career statistics

Club

Notes

References

2001 births
Living people
Colombian footballers
Colombian expatriate footballers
Colombia youth international footballers
Association football midfielders
Atlético Huila footballers
Sport Club Internacional players
Categoría Primera A players
Colombian expatriate sportspeople in Brazil
Expatriate footballers in Brazil
Sportspeople from Santander Department
Colombia under-20 international footballers